Rainy Day Records is a music production company and independent record label that is a subsidiary of Sound City Entertainment Group, the parent company of Sound City recording studios located in Los Angeles. Sound City is celebrating its 40th Anniversary in the recording business in 2009. More than 100 Gold and Platinum albums have been recorded at Sound City over the past 40 years, including albums produced by such record producers as David Foster, Keith Olsen, Richard Dashut, Bill Drescher, Jimmy Iovine, Butch Vig, GGGarth (Richardson), T-Bone Burnett, Andy Johns, Joe Barresi, Tony Berg, Tom Scott, Chris Goss, George Drakoulias, Brendan O'Brien, Matt Wallace, Rick Rubin, Sylvia Massy Shivy, Nick Raskulinecz and Ross Robinson. Rainy Day usually only signs two or three new artists or acts in any given year, and then makes a concerted effort to fully develop and promote those artists that they do sign. Also, Rainy Day Records only uses experienced record producers who have produced or engineered at least one Gold or Platinum album in the production of their albums.

Sound City has recorded albums by such artists as Fleetwood Mac, The Grateful Dead, The Allman Brothers, Buckingham/Nicks, REO Speedwagon, Nirvana, The Black Crowes, Guns N' Roses, Cheap Trick, Foreigner, Santana, Red Hot Chili Peppers, Foo Fighters, Weezer, The Smashing Pumpkins, Tool, Primus, Tonic, Slayer, Eve 6, System of a Down, Judas Priest, Staind, L7, Powerman 5000, Slipknot, Betty Blowtorch, Audioslave, A Perfect Circle, Nine Inch Nails, Rage Against the Machine, Queens of the Stone Age, Ben Folds Five, Kings of Leon, Tom Petty, Elton John, Neil Young, Bob Dylan, Pat Benatar, Rick Springfield, Willie Nelson, Johnny Cash, Carl Perkins, Joan Osborne, Lenny Kravitz, Sheryl Crow, Leon Russell and George Harrison. Rainy Day Records is continuing that legacy by developing the brightest young musical talent in America, while concentrating on the same types of music that has made Sound City one of the most famous recording studios in the world. Rainy Day is currently developing new artists in the musical genres of Rock, Pop, Alternative, R&B, Soul, and certain types of Roots and Country music.

See also
 List of record labels

American independent record labels